The Czech Biomass Association (CZ Biom - České sdružení pro biomasu) is a NGO, which supports the development of phytoenergetics (energy from plant material) in the Czech Republic. Members of CZ BIOM are scientists, specialists, entrepreneurs, and activists interested in using biomass as an energy resource. CZ BIOM is a member of the European Biomass Association.

References

External links

Biom.cz
Website of CZ BIOM, 2002 archive

Bioenergy organizations
Science and technology in the Czech Republic
Environmental organizations based in the Czech Republic
Biomass
Nature conservation organisations based in Europe
Renewable energy organizations